Suicidal Since 1995 is the debut EP by Swedish singer Ängie. It was released on April 6, 2018 via Rich Parents and Universal Music AB. The project was preceded by the singles "Dope" and "Here for My Habits", which dropped on February 2 and March 23, 2018 respectively.

Background and promotion
After signing with Universal, Ängie released the singles "Smoke Weed Eat Pussy", "Housewive Spliffin'" and "Spun", which gained attention from the media and led her to be labeled as the "most controversial star" by The Mirror. On February 2, 2018 she announced her debut EP Suicidal Since 1995 and released "Dope" as its lead single. The music video directed by Christofer Nilsson along Ängie herself was premiered on February 14, 2018. She performed the song in a studio live session at East FM on March 8, 2018 along with the cover of "Venus in Furs", which was revealed later. The second single, "Here for My Habits" came out on March 23, 2018. A double video for "Here for My Habits" and "Venus in Furs" was released on April 24, 2018, also directed by Ängie and Christofer Nilsson.

Composition
About the album's controversial themes, Ängie stated: "I don't think I'm controversial. If a dude was doing the exact thing I'm doing, there wouldn't be any fuss about it. It's because I'm a girl. Maybe I attracted attention because I have bright and playful videos about some taboo subjects. The album is a mini diary of things that have happened in the past." She also stated in an interview with HISKIND that the inspiration behind the album is based on her own life and subjects, describing the release as an "open diary". Simon Lundberg from Gaffa described the record's sound as a mix of Lana Del Rey's parables and vibrato, Uffie and Brooke Candy's rhymes, Tove Lo's poetic lyrics and Yung Lean's music.

Track listing
Credits taken from Qobuz. All tracks produced by Canto.

Sample credits
 "Boss" interpolates elements of the unreleased song "You Can Be The Boss" by Lana Del Rey.

Release history

References

2018 debut EPs
Universal Music Group albums
Ängie albums
Works about suicide